Rowdy Alludu is a 1991 Indian Telugu-language action comedy film directed by K. Raghavendra Rao. The film was produced by Allu Aravind under the banner of Geetha Arts. It stars Chiranjeevi in a dual role, with Sobhana and Divya Bharti. Upon release, the film received positive reviews and was a Super Hit at the box office.

Plot 
Kalyan is an industrialist, whose conniving enemy Venkat Rayudu and his partners, replace him with his doppelgänger Johnny, an Mumbai-based auto driver. They manages to frame Kalyan for murder, but Johnny realizes Kalyan's innocence and saves him. The duo manages to prove Kalyan's innocence, and also defeat Venkat Rayudu and his partners.

Cast 
 Chiranjeevi as Kalyan and Johnny (dual role)
 Shobhana as Sita
 Divya Bharti as Rekha
 Kota Srinivasa Rao as Venkat Rayudu
 Allu Rama Lingaiah as Papi Kondalu
 Captain Raju as Ranjith Kumar
 Brahmanandam as Mental Doctor/ Photographer
 Kaikala Satyanarayana as Kalyan's father
 J. V. Somayajulu as Madhavaiah
 Ironleg Sastri as Jeetendra
 Disco Shanthi in an item number
 Ananth as Peon in Kalyan's Office
 Radha Kumari as Venkat Rayudu's wife
 Annapurna as Kalyan's mother

Production 
The film was intended as a mass entertainer. Allu Ramalingaiah originally questioned the use of the word Rowdy as a prefix to the title name, but was convinced to use the name by K. Raghavendra Rao, Chiranjeevi and Satyanand. Divya Bharti, the then popular Telugu actress, was signed for the role of Rekha and Shobana was signed for the role of Sita. One of the first movies in Tollywood to be shot in Switzerland, the budget didn't allow the producers to take a big crew to Zermatt. The producer Allu Aravind himself worked as costume and make up assistant for Chiranjeevi and Shobana made herself up. The actors and the director came up with the choreography based on the light and scenery around them for the 3 days they had to shoot the "Chiluka Kshemama" song.

Soundtrack

Box office 
Rowdy  Alludu was a "Blockbuster" at the Box office and completed 100 days in almost every theater it was shown. It's Tamil dubbed version, Pokkiri Mappilai was also average in Tamil Nadu.

References 

1991 films
1990s Telugu-language films
Films directed by K. Raghavendra Rao
Indian romantic comedy films
Films shot in Mumbai
Films set in Hyderabad, India
Films set in Mumbai
Films shot in Hyderabad, India
Films shot in Ooty
Films shot in Switzerland
Films scored by Bappi Lahiri
Geetha Arts films
1991 romantic comedy films